The Nokia 1110 and Nokia 1110i are low-end GSM mobile phones sold by Nokia.  The 1110 was released in 2005; the 1110i was released in 2006.  Both are aimed at first-time mobile phone users.  In Nokia's view, the 1110i has the advantage of ease-of-use, reliability and a low price. These phones are very similar to the Nokia 1100.
Between January and May 2007, the 1110 was sold by Nokia as their basic low-end monochrome model, before being superseded by the Nokia 1200. One of its key markets is that of developing countries.

The Nokia 1110 is the second highest sold mobile device of all time, selling about 250 million units.

Features
The Nokia 1110 has an inverted black and white display with amber backlight, while the 1110i has a regular or non-inverted black and white display.

It has 5 hrs battery talktime and allows Call Barring. It has a speaking alarm and clock, analog clock display, and call management timers and counters.

It comes with three built-in games: Pocket Carrom, Dice Games and Snake Xenzia. It supports picture messaging to send a picture greeting. It also included a Ringtone Composer, like the Nokia 1600.

See also
List of best-selling mobile phones

References

External links
 Manufacturer link

1110
Mobile phones introduced in 2006
Nokia phones 1000 series